Çeşməli may refer to:
 Çeşməli, Shaki, Azerbaijan
 Çeşməli, Tovuz, Azerbaijan
 Çeşmeli, Mersin Province, Turkey